Carlyle Thornton Jones (3 April 1904 – 2 June 1951, referred to as Tom Jones in some sources) was an Australian rules footballer who played with Melbourne and St Kilda in the Victorian Football League (VFL).

Death
He died on 2 June 1951 in Hamilton, Victoria, and he was buried at Box Hill Cemetery.

Notes

References
 
 Best on Field, The Sporting Globe, (Wednesday, 11 July 1934), p.9.
 World War Two Nominal Roll: Lance Corporal Carlyle Thornton Jones (V367337), Department of Veterans' Affairs.
 B884, V367337: World War Two Service Record: Lance Corporal Carlyle Thornton Jones (V367337), National Archives of Australia.

External links 

 
 
 "Tom Jones b1904", at Boyles Football Photos.
 Profile at Demonwiki.
 "Trevor Jones" at the VFA Project.

1904 births
1951 deaths
Australian rules footballers from Victoria (Australia)
Melbourne Football Club players
St Kilda Football Club players